The Villiers II was a French two-seat fighter aircraft of the 1920s intended for operation from the Aircraft carrier Béarn of the French Navy.  It was a single-engined tractor biplane with a waterproof hull in the form of a flying boat to allow the aircraft to be safely landed on water in an emergency.  Two prototypes and 30 production aircraft were built, the type serving briefly with the French Navy, although never operated from an aircraft carrier.

Development and design

In 1924, the French aircraft manufacturer Ateliers d'Aviation François Villiers was formed at Meudon near Paris. One of its first designs was to meet a requirement of the French Navy for a two-seat shipboard fighter.  Villier's design, the Villiers II was a single-engined sesquiplane (i.e. a biplane with the lower wing much smaller than the upper wing). Although of conventional tractor configuration with the engine in the nose driving a two-bladed propeller, and a tailwheel undercarriage, in order to allow safe ditching in the event of an emergency, it had a number of unusual features, with the fuselage being watertight and in the form of a flying boat hull, and the undercarriage being jettisonable.

Two prototypes were ordered, under the designation Vil 2AMC2 (Avion Marin Chasse Biplace), one powered by a 450 hp (338 kW) Hispano-Suiza 12H V12 engine and the other with a similarly powered Lorraine-Dietrich 12Eb W12 engine. After evaluation by the Aéronautique Maritime in May 1925, an order for 30 Vil 2AMC2 to be powered by the Lorraine-Dietrich engine, (together with an order for 20 of the competing Levasseur PL.5s) was placed on 19 December 1925.

Operational history

The Villiers II entered service with Escadrille 5C1 based at Hyères near Toulon in Southern France in May 1927, with the aircraft never being operated from Béarn.  It was replaced by the single-seat Gourdou-Leseurre GL.32, which did not have the same elaborate features for landing on water in September 1928.

Operators 

Aéronautique Maritime
Escadrille 5C1

Specifications (Vil 2AMC2 )

See also

References

Green, William and Swanborough, Gordon. The Complete Book of Fighters. New York:Smithmark, 1994. .
Gunston, Bill. World Encyclopedia of Aircraft Manufacturers. Stroud, UK:Sutton Publishing, 2nd Edition, 2005. .
"The Paris Airshow 1926". Flight, 2 December 1926, pp. 775–791.

External links
aviafrance

1920s French fighter aircraft
Carrier-based aircraft
Sesquiplanes
Villiers aircraft
Single-engined tractor aircraft
Aircraft first flown in 1925